The Wartburg Knights women's basketball team represents the Wartburg College in Waverly, Iowa, United States. The team is a member of the American Rivers Conference as well as the National Collegiate Athletic Association. The team plays its regular season games in Levick Arena, along with men's basketball, wrestling, and volleyball teams.

History
Wartburg women's basketball began in 1974, under head coach Doug Johnson. The first Wartburg team finished 12–3 in 1974–75, its first victory coming against the Northern Iowa Panthers. Johnson coached only one season at Wartburg, which marked first winning season. Since Johnson Wartburg has had a total of 7 head coaches, the majority of the seasons coached by Monica Severson and current head coach Bob Amsberry.

The 2015–16 season Wartburg broke through to their first final four in school history.  The unranked Knights got an at-large bid to the NCAA tournament for the first time since 2002.  They would beat 3 ranked teams on their way to a regional championship and finish the season 23–8.  Since that year the Knights have made it to 7 straight NCAA tournaments and made another appearance in the final four in 2018.

NCAA tournament results
Wartburg has appeared in 16 NCAA Tournaments with a record of 23–16.

Head Coaching Records

References

External links
 

College women's basketball teams in the United States
Basketball, women's